Trevor William Robbins CBE FRS FMedSci is a Professor of cognitive neuroscience and former Head of the Department of Psychology at the University of Cambridge. Robbins interests are in the fields of cognitive neuroscience, behavioural neuroscience and psychopharmacology.

Robbins is Director of the University of Cambridge Behavioural and Clinical Neuroscience Institute (BCNI). He is a Fellow of Downing College and Past-President of the British Neuroscience Association (BNA), the British Association for Psychopharmacology (BAP) and the European Behavioural Pharmacology Society (EBPS).

Education
Following admittance in Jesus College at the University of Cambridge, Robbins obtained his Bachelor of Arts (First Class Honours) in psychology in 1971. Following this, he received his PhD degree from the University of Cambridge in 1975 for an analysis of the behavioural effects of Dextroamphetamine.

Robbins is a keen chess player and represented both England Juniors in 1967 and the University of Cambridge as an undergraduate. He was once ranked in the top twenty players in England and had one of his wins from a Varsity match in 1970 featured as a classic game in The Sunday Times.

Career
Robbins was appointed as a Demonstrator in the Department of Experimental Psychology at the University of Cambridge in 1973. He was subsequently promoted to Lecturer and Reader, before becoming Professor of Cognitive Neuroscience in 1997. Robbins was elected to the Chair, and therefore Head of Department, of Psychology in October 2002, stepping down from the latter role in 2017.

The focus of Robbins' work is on the functions of the frontal lobes of the brain and their regulation by the chemical neurotransmitter systems in humans and other animals. This work is relevant to neuropsychiatric disorders including schizophrenia, depression, drug addiction, obsessive compulsive disorder (OCD), attention deficit hyperactivity disorder (ADHD), as well as Parkinson's and Alzheimer's diseases. Robbins also employs psychological paradigms for investigating cognitive functions, including planning, decision making, learning, attention and self-control, often with brain imaging. His research covers the mechanisms underlying possible cognitive enhancing effects of drugs and understanding the causation and neural basis of drug addiction and impulsive-compulsive behaviour.

The work of Robbins and his collaborators led to the formation of the BCNI in 2005, which is jointly funded by the Medical Research Council (MRC) and the Wellcome Trust. Robbins is director of the institute, which focuses on translational work leading to the treatment of neuropsychiatric disorders.

Robbins Chaired the MRC Neuroscience and Mental Health Research Board between 1995 and 1999, and was co-leader of the UK Government 2005 Foresight Project entitled 'Drug Futures 2025?'. He has also consulted for the Prime Minister of the United Kingdom on the state of UK research. Since 2005, Robbins has been a Fellow of the Royal Society. In addition, he is a Fellow of the British Psychological Society (since 1990) and a Fellow of the Academy of Medical Sciences (since 2000).

Robbins has published over 850 full papers in scientific journals, including Nature, Brain, Science and Nature Neuroscience. The ISI Web of Science credits Robbins with a Hirsch (h) index of 199 and is credited as one of the top cited authors in Neuroscience. He has been an editor of the journal Psychopharmacology since 1980, is a Member of the Editorial Board of the journal Science, and is Co-Editor-in-Chief of the journal Current Opinion in Behavioral Sciences. In 2017–2018 he was a guest co-editor of a theme issue of the Philosophical Transactions of the Royal Society. 
Robbins has co-edited 7 books, including Psychology for Medicine, The Neurobiology of Addiction and Decision Making, Effect and Learning.

Inventions
Robbins' research uses neuropsychological tests, such as the Cambridge Neuropsychological Test Automated Battery (CANTAB), which he co-invented with Professor Barbara Sahakian in the 1980s. CANTAB is now used at over 700 research institutes worldwide and is backed by over 1,200 peer-review articles. Robbins serves as a Senior Consultant to Cambridge Cognition, a spin-out of the University of Cambridge. Cambridge Cognition now provides CANTAB.

The CANTAB PAL touchscreen test, which assesses visual memory and new learning, received the highest rating of world-leading 4* grade from the Research Excellence Framework (REF) 2014. Following this award, CANTAB and CANTAB PAL were highlighted in the Medical Schools Council 'Health of the Nation' 2015 publication, which described CANTAB as a boost to the UK economy.
Robbins is also a co-author of the neurochemical Functional Ensemble of Temperament model that mapped the functional roles of brain neurotransmitters to main aspects of behavioural regulation.

Press
Robbins has frequently appeared in press interviews to discuss his research such as The Guardian, BBC News, The Daily Express and the Naked Scientists podcast. He frequently engages the public in science, such as speaking at the Hay Festival and participating in a feature on smart drugs for BBC Online.

Awards

Robbins's work was acknowledged by the following honours and awards:

 2005 – (co-recipient) The Neuronal Plasticity Prize, which was awarded by the Ipsen Foundation for his work on motivation and the striatum. 
 2011 – (joint) Award of the American Psychological Association (APA) Distinguished Scientific Award for his research in experimental psychology and neuroscience. 
 2012 – Appointed Commander of the Order of the British Empire in the 2012 UK New Year Honours for services to medical research.
 2012 – The Award of the Angharad Dodds John Fellowship in Mental Health and Neuropsychiatry at Downing College, Cambridge.
 2014 – (along with Professor Stanislas Dehaene and Professor Giacomo Rizzolatti) – The Award of the Grete Lundbeck European Brain Research Prize 2014, also known as The Brain Prize, for Robbins' pioneering research on higher brain mechanisms and his efforts to understand cognitive and behavioural disorders. The award was presented at a Ceremony in Denmark in May 2014.
 2015 – Robert Sommer Award for Research into Schizophrenia
 2015 – British Association for Psychopharmacology- Lifetime Achievement Award
 2016 – Gold Medal of the Society of Biological Psychiatry (USA)
 2017 – Patricia Goldman-Rakic Award in Cognitive Neuroscience
 2017 – Fellow, British Pharmacological Society (FBPhS)
 2018 – Honorary Professor, Fudan University, Shanghai, China
 2019 – British Psychological Society - Lifetime Achievement Award
 2022- Association of Psychological Science - William James Fellow Award

External links
 Professor Trevor Robbins: Cambridge Neuroscience
Prof. Trevor Robbins:University of Cambridge

References

1949 births
Living people
British neuroscientists
British psychologists
Academics of the University of Cambridge
Fellows of Downing College, Cambridge
Fellows of the Royal Society
Fellows of the Academy of Medical Sciences (United Kingdom)
Commanders of the Order of the British Empire
Alumni of Jesus College, Cambridge
People educated at Battersea Grammar School